White Fire is a thriller novel by American writers Douglas Preston and Lincoln Child. It was released on November 12, 2013 by Grand Central Publishing. This is the thirteenth book in the Special Agent Pendergast series. The preceding novel is Two Graves.

Plot
Corrie Swanson sets out to solve a long-forgotten mystery. In 1876, in a remote mining camp called Roaring Fork in the Colorado Rockies, several miners were killed in devastating grizzly bear attacks. Now the town has become an exclusive ski resort and its historic cemetery has been dug up to make way for development. Corrie has arranged to examine the remains of the dead miners. But in doing so she makes a shocking discovery that threatens the resort's very existence. The town's leaders, trying to stop her from exposing their community's dark and bloody past, arrest and jail her. Special Agent Pendergast of the FBI arrives to help—just as a series of brutal arson attacks on multimillion-dollar homes terrify the town and drive away tourists. Drawn irresistibly into the investigation, Pendergast discovers an unlikely secret in Roaring Fork's past, connecting the resort to a chance meeting between Sir Arthur Conan Doyle and Oscar Wilde. With the town under siege, and Corrie's life in desperate danger, Pendergast must solve the riddle of the past... before the town of present goes up in flames.

Reception

—Review by Publishers Weekly

References

External links
 Two Graves by Douglas Preston and Lincoln Child 
 A review of White Fire
 Official website 
 

American thriller novels
Novels by Douglas Preston
Novels by Lincoln Child
Collaborative novels
Sequel novels
2013 American novels
Grand Central Publishing books